Peter is a common name. As a given name, it is generally derived from Peter the Apostle, born Simon, whom Jesus renamed "Peter" after he declared that Jesus indeed was the Messiah. The name "Peter" roughly means "rock" in Greek.

Religion

 Saint Peter (died 64–68), Jesus' disciple 
 Peter I of Alexandria (d. 311), Pope and Patriarch of Alexandria
 Peter the Deacon (died 605), confidant of Pope Gregory I and rector of Sicily
 Peter of Canterbury (died c. 610), abbot
 Peter of Pavia (bishop) (died 735), saint and Bishop of Pavia
 Peter of Anagni (died 1105), saint and Bishop Of Anagni
 Peter, bishop of Zaragoza (Spain) in 1112
 Peter the Deacon (died c. 1140), "the Librarian" (Bibliothecarius)
 Peter II of Tarentaise (1102–1174), Archbishop of Tarentaise and saint
 Peter Pareuzi (died 1199), Papal legate, martyr and saint
 Peter, a companion in martyrdom of Berard of Carbio (died 1220)
 Saint Peter of Verona (1206–1252), also known as Peter Martyr
 Peter of Auvergne (died after 1310), scholastic philosopher
 Saint Peter of Moscow (died 1326), Metropolitan of Moscow and all Russia
 Saint Peter of Murom (1167–1228), Prince of Murom and Wonderworker
 Peter of Aquila (died 1361), Italian Franciscan theologian and bishop
 Peter of Bergamo (died 1482), Dominican theologian
 Peter Martyr Vermigli (1499–1562), Reformation-era theologian
 Saint Peter the Aleut (died 1815?), Eastern Orthodox Christian martyr in California
 Manuel Corral, leader of the Palmarian Christian Church from 2005 to 2011 under the title Pope Peter II
 Peter (Loukianoff) (born 1948), archbishop of the Russian Orthodox Church Outside of Russia
 Peter (Musteață) (born 1967), Russian Orthodox bishop of Ungheni and Nisporeni, Moldova

Nobility
 Peter (diplomat) (fl. 860s–870s), Bulgarian noble
 Peter (judge royal) (fl. 1183), nobleman in the Kingdom of Hungary
 Peter, Constable of Portugal (1429–1466), third Grand Master of the Order of Saint Benedict of Aviz
 Peter, Count of Dammartin (died 1106), son of Hugh I
 Peter, Duke of Coimbra (1392–1449), Portuguese prince of the House of Aviz
 Peter, Duke of the Romans, 11th century Roman consul
 Peter, King of Hungary (born 1010s), King of Hungary
 Peter, son of Petenye (fl. c. 1400), Hungarian lord
 Peter, son of Töre (died 1213), Hungarian lord, served as judge royal in 1198
 Peter I, Count of Alençon (1251–1284), Count of Perche, son of Louis IX of France
 Peter I of Aragon and Pamplona (c. 1068–1104), king of Aragon and Pamplona
 Peter I of Arborea (d. 1214), king of Sardinia
 Peter I of Bulgaria (died 970), emperor of Bulgaria
 Peter I of Courtenay (1126–1183), French noble
 Peter I of Cyprus (1328–1369), king of Cyprus
 Peter I of Portugal (1320–1367), king of Portugal
 Peter I of Serbia (1844–1921) king of Serbia
 Peter of Castile (1334–1369), king of Castile and León
 Peter of Greece and Denmark (1908–1980), prince
 Peter the Great (1672–1725), first Russian emperor
 Peter II of Russia (1715–1730), third Russian emperor
 Peter III of Russia (1728–1762), seventh Russian emperor

Actors
 Peter (actor) (born 1952), Japanese actor
 Peter Bogdanovich (1939–2022), American film director and actor
 Peter Boyle (1935–2006), American actor
 Peter Brocco (1903–1992), American actor 
 Peter Capaldi (born 1958), Scottish actor, twelfth Doctor Who
 Peter Capell (1912–1986), German actor
 Peter Cullen (born 1941), Canadian voice actor
 Peter Cushing (1913–1994), English actor
 Peter Davison (born 1951), English actor, fifth Doctor Who
 Peter Dinklage (born 1969), American actor
 Peter Duncan (actor), (born 1954), Blue Peter presenter and UK Chief Scout
 Peter Facinelli (born 1973), American actor and producer
 Peter Falk (1927–2011), American actor
 Peter Finch (1916–1977), English-Australian actor
 Peter Firth (born 1953), English actor
 Peter Fonda (1940–2019), American actor
 Peter Hawkins (1924–2006), British actor
 Peter Hermann (born 1967), American actor
 Peter Hooten (born 1950), American actor
 Peter Jurasik (born 1950), American actor
 Peter Kraus (born 1939), Austrian singer and actor 
 Peter Lorre (1904–1964), Hollywood actor
 Peter Mayhew (1944-2019), American actor
 Peter McRobbie (born 1943), Scottish-born American actor
 Peter Noone, (born 1947) English singer-songwriter and actor. Lead singer of Herman's Hermits
 Peter Ostrum (born 1957), American veterinarian and child actor
 Peter O'Brian (actor), New Zealand/Indonesian actor
 Peter O'Toole (1932–2013), English actor
 Peter Purves (born 1939), English actor
 Peter Scanavino (born 1980), American actor
 Peter Sellers (1925–1980), British actor
 Peter Strauss (born 1947), American actor
 Peter Ustinov (1921–2004), English actor, writer and dramatist
 Peter Wingfield (born 1962), Welsh actor

Sportsmen
 Peter Aerts (born 1970), Dutch kickboxer
 Peter Aitken (born 1954), Welsh footballer
 Peter Alonso (born 1994), American baseball player
 Peter Asch (born 1948), American water polo player
 Péter Bakonyi (fencer, born 1938), Hungarian saber fencer
 Peter Baum (born 1990), American lacrosse player
 Peter Bonetti (1941–2020), English footballer
 Peter Bore (born 1987), English footballer
 Peter Crawford (born 1979), Australian basketball player
 Peter Creamer (born 1953), English footballer
 Peter Crouch (born 1981), English footballer
 Peter Desmond (1926–1990), Irish footballer
 Peter Duffield (born 1969), English footballer
 Peter Ezugwu (born 1976), English business man and former professional basketball player
Peter Fishbach (born 1947), American tennis player
 Peter Fuzes (born 1947), Australian soccer player
 Peter Jacobs (fencer) (born 1938), British Olympic fencer
 Peter Kalambayi (born 1995), American football player
 Peter Khalife (born 1990), Lebanese-Swedish football agent, manager and player
 Peter Kirkham (born 1974), English footballer
 Peter Lorimer (1946–2021), Scottish footballer
 Peter McGiffin, Australian cricket coach
 Peter Moylan (born 1978), Australian professional baseball player
 Peter Pickering (1926–2006), English footballer
 Peter Polansky, Canadian tennis player
 Peter Popely (born 1943), English footballer
 Peter Rennert (born 1958), American tennis player
 Peter Schaale (born 1996), German footballer
 Peter Schifrin (born 1958), American Olympic fencer and sculptor
 Peter Schmid (1898–?), Swiss Olympic skier
 Peter Senerchia (born 1967), American professional wrestling commentator, wrestler, and radio personality best known by his ring name Taz
 Peter Spooner (1910–1987), English footballer
 Peter Thornley (born 1941), English professional wrestler best known for the ring character Kendo Nagasaki
 Peter Till (born 1985), English footballer
 Peter Wales (1928–2008), English cricketer
 Peter Wallace (born 1985), Australian rugby player
 Peter Wragg (1931–2004), English footballer
 Peter Zauner (born 1983), Austrian badminton player

Other
 Peter (curopalates) (died 602), Byzantine general and brother of Emperor Maurice
 Peter (floruit 926), governor of Rome, Roman consul and brother of Pope John X
 Peter (stratopedarches), Byzantine eunuch general
 Peter (usurper) (died 506), Roman "tyrant" (usurper) against the Visigothic rulers of Spain
 Peter the Byzantine (fl. 1770–1808), Greek cantor and composer
 Peter the Patrician (c. 500–565), East Roman or Byzantine official, diplomat and historian
 Peter the Peloponnesian (c. 1735 – 1778), Greek cantor and composer
 Peter Alexander (disambiguation), various people
 Peter Alldridge, British lawyer
 Peter Daniel Anthonisz (1822–1903), Sri Lankan Burgher doctor, 1st President of the Ceylon Branch of the British Medical Association
 Peter Bainbridge (disambiguation), various people
 Peter Baxter (disambiguation), various people
 Peter Beale (British Army officer) (born 1934), lieutenant-general and Surgeon-General of the British Armed Forces (1991–1994)
 Peter Beard (1938–2020) American artist, photographer, diarist and writer
 Peter Best (disambiguation), various people
 Peter Bishop (artist) (born 21 May 1953), English painter and art historian
 Peder Björk (born 1975), Swedish politician
 Peter Borish, American investor and trader
 Peter William Cassey (1831–1917), African-American 19th-century school founder, minister, and abolitionist.
 Peter Carter (disambiguation), various people
 Alan Peter Cayetano, Filipino politician and current speaker of the House of Representatives
 Peter Cetera (born 1944), American singer-songwriter 
 Peter Chandler (soccer) (1953–2022), American football player
 Peter Chandler (politician) (born 1965), Australian politician
 Peter Chester (born 1954), English convicted murderer and pedophile
 Peter Colotka, (1925–2019), Slovak academic, lawyer and politician, Prime Minister of the Slovak Socialist Republic (1969–1988)
 Peter Crawford (1818–1889), Scottish-born surveyor and pioneer
 Peter De Abrew (1862–1940), Sri Lankan Sinhala industrialist and philanthropist
Peter Durant, American politician
 Peter Elsbach (1924–2020), Dutch physician
 Péter Esterházy (1950–2016), Hungarian author
 Peter F. Gontha (born 1948), Indonesian chief executive officer
 Peter J. Fos (born 1949), first president and seventh chief executive of the University of New Orleans
 Peter Frame (1957–2018), American ballet dancer
 Peter Frampton (born 1950), English rock musician, singer-songwriter
 Peter Gabriel (born 1950), English rock musician, singer-songwriter and humanitarian
 Peter J. Ganci Jr. (c. 1946–2001), American firefighter
 Peter van Gestel (1937–2019), Dutch writer
 Peter Gibb (1954–2011), Australian criminal and prison escapee
 Peter Greenaway (born 1942), British filmmaker
 Peter Gavin Hall (1951–2016), Australian researcher in probability theory and mathematical statistics
 Peter Hayman (1914–1992), British diplomat and paedophile
 Peter Hedberg (born 1990), Swedish politician
 Peter Hederstedt (born 1963), Swedish officer
 Peter Hitchens (born 1951), English journalist and author
 Peter Holmes (disambiguation), various people
 Peter Jackson (born 1961), New Zealand film director, screenwriter and film producer
 Peter Jeffrey (badminton) (born 1975), Badminton England Head Coach
 Peter Jennings (1938–2005), ABC News anchor
 Peter Johnsson (born 1962), Swedish politician
 Peter Joseph, (born 1979), American independent filmmaker and activist
 Peter Kloeppel, German journalist
 Peter Knight (disambiguation), various people
 Peter Kropotkin (1842–1921), anarcho-communist revolutionary and philosopher
 Peter Kürten (1883–1931), German serial killer and rapist
 Peter Laird (born 1954), American comic book writer and artist
 Peter Law (1948–2006), Welsh politician
 Peter Lee Shih Shiong (born 1966), Singaporean singer-songwriter
 Peter Lim (born 1954), Singaporean businessman
 Peter Linde (born 1946), Swedish sculptor
 Peter Lougheed (1928–2012), Premier of Alberta, Canada
 Peter Maffay (born 1949), Romanian-born German singer
 Peter Max (born 1937), Jewish German-born American illustrator and graphic artist
 Peter McReynolds, Northern Irish politician
 Peter Medawar (1915–1987), British biologist and Nobel laureate
 Peter Morris (disambiguation), various people
 Peter Musñgi (born 1945), Filipino broadcast journalist, voice over artist and radio DJ
 Peter O'Brian (film producer) (born 1947), Canadian film producer
 Peter O'Brien (disambiguation), various people
 Peter Oliver (disambiguation), various people
 Peter Paul Montgomery Buttigieg, commonly known as Pete Buttigieg, former mayor of South Bend, Indiana and 2020 Democratic presidential candidate
 Peter Pellegrini (born 1975), Slovak politician
 Peter Peregrinus of Maricourt, 13th century French scholar and magnetism experimenter
 Peter Perry (disambiguation), various people
 Peter Persson (born 1955), Swedish politician
 Peter Petersen (disambiguation), various people
 Peter Peterson (disambiguation), various people
 Peter Rådberg (born 1956), Swedish politician
 Peter Rehberg (1968–2021), Austrian-British musician
 Peter Rennert (born 1958), American tennis player
 Peter Revson (1939–1974), American racing driver
 Peter Righton (1926–2007), British child protection expert, social care worker and child molester
 Peter Schiff, stock broker, financial commentator, and radio personality
 Peter Schilling (born 1956), German singer
 Peter Schmid (archaeologist) (1926–2022), German archaeologist
 Peter Schmid (swimmer) (born 1949), Austrian swimmer
 Peter Schowtka (1945–2022), German politician
 Peter Scott (1909–1989), British ornithologist
 Peter Scully (born 1963), Australian criminal
 Peter Seabrook (1935–2022), British gardening writer
 Peter Shalson (born 1957), British businessman
 Peter Shaw (disambiguation), various people
 Peter Shukoff (born 1979), American comedian, musician and YouTube celebrity
 Peter Shumlin (born 1956), American politician
 Peter Steffensen (born 1979), Danish badminton player
 Peter Stöger (born 1966), German football coach
 Peter Stone (disambiguation), various people
 Peter Stronach (born 1956), English footballer
 Peter Sutcliffe (disambiguation), various people
 Peter Sutcliffe (1946–2020), prolific English serial killer
 Peter Swan (disambiguation), various people
 Peter Tait (disambiguation), various people
 Peter Tham, Singaporean stockbroker
 Peter Thomas (disambiguation), multiple people
 Peter Tobin (1946–2022), Scottish serial killer
 Peter Tork (1942–2019), American singer and guitarist
 Peter Tosh (1944–1987) Jamaican reggae musician
 Peter Truong, convicted child sexual abuser
 Peter Truscott, Baron Truscott, British Labour Party politician and peer
 Peter van der Voort (born 1964), Dutch physician, professor, and politician
 Peter Wallis (born 1935), British diplomat
 Peter Whittle (disambiguation), various people
 Peter Williams (disambiguation), various people
 Peter Willis (disambiguation), various people
 Peter Woodcock (1939–2010), Canadian serial killer, rapist, and necrophile
 Peter Yarrow (born 1938), American singer and songwriter, Peter, Paul and Mary
 Peter Wu Junwei (born 1963), Chinese Catholic Bishop

Fictional characters
 Black Peter, from the card game Old Maid.
 Peter McCallister, a protagonist in the Home Alone franchise.
 Peter Beaupre, a recurring protagonist in the movie Home Alone 3.
 Little Peter, in the fairy tale Little Peter's Journey to the Moon.
 Peter the goatherd, in Heidi.
 Peter the Young Pioneer, from the symphonic fairy tale Peter and the Wolf.
 Peter Barlow, a character from the British soap opera series Coronation Street.
 Peter Beale, on the BBC soap opera EastEnders.
 Peter Bishop, in the TV series Fringe.
 Peter Burnford, on Disney's Homeward Bound: The Incredible Journey.
 Peter Brady, on the TV series The Brady Bunch.
 Peter Dawe, in the film Cyberbully.
 Peter Friedkin, a character from Final Destination 5.
 Peter Griffin, the protagonist of the animated series Family Guy.
 Peter Gunn, private eye protagonist of Peter Gunn, a 1958–1961 American television series
 Peter Hale, Teen Wolf
 Peter Kirkland (Sealand) from the anime Hetalia.
 Pete Lattimer, in the TV series Warehouse 13.
 Pietro or Peter Maximoff, aka Quicksilver, from Marvel Comics.
 Sister Peter Marie, in the TV series Oz.
 Peter McCallister, Kevin's father in the Home Alone franchise.
 Peter McGee, a character from The Ghost and Molly McGee.
 Peter Pan, created by Scottish novelist and playwright J. M. Barrie.
 Peter Parker, the secret identity of Spider-Man, a Marvel Comics superhero.
 Peter Perfect, on the Hanna-Barbera animated series Wacky Races.
 Peter Petrelli, on the NBC television series Heroes.
 Peter Pettigrew, from Harry Potter novels.
 Peter Pevensie, in The Chronicles of Narnia by C. S. Lewis.
 Peter Pinkerton, the younger brother of Pinkalicious in the Pinkalicious book series and its animated series adaptation Pinkalicious & Peterrific.
 Professor Peter Port, a recurring character in the American animated web series RWBY.
 Peter Puppy, Earthworm Jim's sidekick from the Earthworm Jim franchise.
 Peter Quill, leader of the Guardians of the Galaxy in the Marvel Universe.
 Peter Rabbit, an anthropomorphic character in various children's stories by Beatrix Potter.
 Piotr "Peter" Rasputin, aka Colossus, from Marvel Comics.
 Pete Ross, a DC Comics character commonly associated with Superman.
 Peter Rumancek from Hemlock Grove.
 Peter Solomon, in the novel The Lost Symbol, by Dan Brown.
 Peter Stone, from the TV series Degrassi: The Next Generation.
 Peter Van Holp, in the novel Hans Brinker, or The Silver Skates, by Mary Mapes Dodge.
 Peter Venkman, one of the main characters in the Ghostbusters franchise.
 Peter Vincent, a vampire slayer in the 1985 film Fright Night and its 2011 remake.
 Peter Wiggin, Ender's older brother in the Ender's Game series by Orson Scott Card.
 Lord Peter Wimsey, Gentleman Detective in a series of novels by Dorothy L Sayers.
 Peter Zylbergold, in the film Cyberbully.
 Struwwelpeter, in the German children's book by Heinrich Hoffmann.
 Peter from the nursery rhyme Peter Peter Pumpkin Eater.
 Peter from the Wee Sing 1988 film Grandpa's Magical Toys.
 Peter, in the film The Room.
 Peter, the name of many characters in the animated TV series South Park.
 Perfect Peter, from the British animated series Horrid Henry.

See also
 Peter (disambiguation)
 Pete (disambiguation)
 Peters (disambiguation)
 Pierre (disambiguation)
 Piter (disambiguation)
 Petrus (disambiguation)
 All pages beginning with Peter

Peter